Events from the year 1857 in Denmark.

Incumbents 
 Monarch – Frederick VII
 Prime minister – Carl Christoffer Georg Andræ (until 13 May), Carl Christian Hall

Events 
 March  The first annual Charlottenborg Spring Exhibition opens.
 30 June – Hassel & Teudt is founded in Copenhagen.
 17 September  The Folketeatret opens in Copenhagen.

Undated 
 Svanemøllen is constructed on ther island of Bornholm.
 A new main building at Vibygård is constructed.
 Axel E. Aamodts Lithografiske Etablissement is founded.
  Christiani & Grisson is acquired by Wilhelm Hansen.

Births 
 24 July – Henrik Pontoppidan, Nobel Prize-winning writer (died 1943)
 7 December – Hans-Georg Tersling, architect (died 1920)
 9 December – Alba Schwartz, writer and novelist (died 1942)

Deaths 
 23 June – Christian Molbech, historian and editor (born 1783)

References 

 
1850s in Denmark
Denmark
Years of the 19th century in Denmark